Omarr Conner (born November 22, 1984) is a former American football quarterback who played for the Mississippi State Bulldogs in 2003, 2004, 2005, and 2006.

Conner played wide receiver in 2003 before taking over the starting quarterback job in 2004. Near the end of the 2005 season, he moved back to wide receiver when Michael Henig won the quarterback job. Conner returned to the quarterback job when Henig was hurt in 2006, leading the Bulldogs to an overtime win over UAB with a 25-yard touchdown run. Conner himself was injured in a loss to West Virginia but returned to action late in the season when Henig was hurt again.

Conner finished his career with 3,070 passing yards. His four-touchdown performance against Murray State in 2005 is tied for the second most in school history.

References

1984 births
Living people
American football quarterbacks
People from Starkville, Mississippi
Mississippi State Bulldogs football players